Turner High School may refer to:

F. J. Turner High School in Beloit, Wisconsin
Henry McNeal Turner High School in Atlanta, Georgia
R. L. Turner High School in Carrollton, Texas
Turner High School (Kansas) in Kansas City, Kansas